Örnarna is a speedway club from Mariestad in Sweden, who compete in the Allsvenskan. Their home track is at the Grevby Motorstadion which is located to the North of Mariestad.

History
Örnarna Speedway Club was founded in 1949. The team won the Swedish Speedway Team Championship four times in five years 1992, 1993, 1994 and 1996, when they competed in the highest league called the Elitserien.

On several occasions the club have competed in the second tier of Swedish speedway, now called the Allsvenskan (National League), which they won in 1958, 1963, 1969, 1976, 2001, 2004, 2010 and 2011. 

The club have since returned to the Allsvenskan, and finished 4th during the 2022 Swedish Speedway season.

Season summary

Teams

2022 team
  Joel Andersson 
  Ludvig Lindgren
  Valentin Grobauer 
  Matic Ivačič
  Erik Persson
  Max Belsing 
  Tomasz Orwat 
  Alexander Jakobsson Sundkvist
  Glenn Moi

References 

Swedish speedway teams
Sport in Västra Götaland County